Sympistis figurata is a moth of the family Noctuidae first described by Leon F. Harvey in 1875. It is found in the United States east of the Cascade Range in Washington and Oregon.

The wingspan is 27–31 mm.

Subspecies
The former subspecies Oncocnemis figurata pallidior, has been elevated to species status and transferred to the genus Sympistis as Sympistis pallidior.

References

figurata
Moths of North America
Moths described in 1875